François Hesnault (born 30 December 1956) is a former racing driver from France.  He participated in 21 Formula One Grands Prix, debuting on 25 March 1984. He scored no championship points.

Hesnault enjoyed some success in the French Formula Three Championship, finishing third in the series in 1982 and second in 1983.

The Frenchman debuted in Formula One in the  season with Ligier, with a best result of 7th at the Dutch Grand Prix. For the  season, he was hired to be Nelson Piquet's teammate at Brabham, but he was sacked after four uncompetitive races. He returned for a one-off at the German Grand Prix in a third Renault which carried a prototype onboard camera, making it the first use of this technology in a Grand Prix. This is also the last race in which three cars have been entered for the same team (current third drivers are not eligible to compete in the races). After this race, Hesnault retired from motor racing, having suffered a particularly heavy crash in testing at Circuit Paul Ricard shortly before parting company with Brabham.

Complete Formula One World Championship results
(key)

References
Profile at grandprix.com

1956 births
Living people
Sportspeople from Neuilly-sur-Seine
French racing drivers
French Formula One drivers
Ligier Formula One drivers
Brabham Formula One drivers
Renault Formula One drivers
24 Hours of Le Mans drivers
World Sportscar Championship drivers